is a feminine Japanese given name.

Possible writings
In Japanese the character  ("ko") means "child". The name can be written many different ways, and has different meanings depending on which kanji is used for "aki" (as well as the hiragana and katakana). Some variations of Akiko include:
亜妃子 ("Asia, queen, child")
安希子 ("peaceful, hope, child")
明子 ("bright, child")
充子 ("provide, child")
上子 ("superior, above, child")
暁子 ("dawn, child")

Notable people
Princess Akiko of Mikasa (彬子女王), member of the Japanese Imperial Family
, Japanese announcer and actress
, Japanese cross-country skier
, Japanese speed skater
, former governor of Chiba Prefecture, Japan
, Japanese long jumper
, Japanese Ryūkōka singer
 Japanese voice actress and singer
, Japanese ice hockey player
, Japanese actress, television talent, and former gravure idol
, Japanese voice actress
, Japanese actress, singer, tarento, and politician
, Japanese writer
, born 1978), Japanese rower who competed in the 2012 Summer Olympics
, Japanese politician of the People's New Party, and a member of the House of Councillors in the Diet
, Japanese field hockey player
, Japanese tennis player
, a Japanese singer, composer, arranger, and songwriter
, voice actress and singer from Japan
, a Japanese actress and the first Miss Universe to come from Asia
, Japanese actress
, Japanese television personality and actress
, Japanese engineer
Akiko Matsuura, singer and drummer from Osaka, Japan who plays for the British bands; The Big Pink, Comanechi, and Pre
, Japanese javelin thrower
, Japanese badminton player
, an actress and model from Japan
, Japanese tennis player
, Japanese ice hockey player
, Japanese voice actress
, Japanese shogi player
, Japanese actress
, Japanese women's footballer
, Japanese actress
, Japanese composer and singer-songwriter
, Japanese classical violinist
, Japanese figure skater
, professional shogi player
, jazz keyboard musician, composer, organist, and pianist from Osaka
, singer and television tarento from Ikuno-ku
, Japanese actress best known for her role as the Bond girl Aki in the 1967 James Bond film You Only Live Twice
, an actress from Kawasaki, Japan
, voice actress from Kashiwazaki, Japan
, a Japanese singer and pop/jazz musician
, backgammon player 
, Japanese poet, feminist and social reformer of late 19th-early 20th century Japan
Akiko Yoshida (吉田 亜紀子, born 1976), Japanese pop singer better known under her stagename KOKIA
 Empress Shōshi, former Empress of Japan, who was also known as Akiko

Fictional characters
Aki, a female ninja and Japanese agent played by Akiko Wakabayashi in the 1967 James Bond film, You Only Live Twice. Wakabayashi convinced director Lewis Gilbert to change the name of her character to one closer to her own
Akiko Hiroguchi, a girl born with fur in the 1985 Kurt Vonnegut novel Galápagos
Akiko Minase (水瀬 秋子), a supporting character in the anime, visual novel, and manga series Kanon
Akiko Narumi (鳴海 亜樹子), a character in the tokusatsu drama series Kamen Rider W
Akiko Bloom, a character in CutiePieMarzia (Marzia Bisognin)'s novel Dream House
Akiko Yosano, a character in Bungo Stray Dogs

Japanese feminine given names